Dactyloceras noellae is a moth in the family Brahmaeidae. It was described by Thierry Bouyer in 2006. It is found in Kenya.

References

Endemic moths of Kenya
Brahmaeidae
Moths described in 2006